Operation Harel was a 1948 IDF operation that was conducted by the Palmach. Its two objectives were to bring food and supplies to besieged Jerusalem, and to transport troops near the city. The operation took place between 16 and 21 April as a continuation to Operation Nachshon and was commanded by Yitzhak Rabin. It brought three convoys of over 600 trucks. It also resulted in the formation of Palmach battalions into the Harel Brigade. The supplying of Jerusalem with food, medicine, arms, and fuel, enabled the city to withstand the siege, a siege which continued for the next two months, until the opening of the Burma Road in mid-June.

References

Harel
April 1948 events in Asia